The Pennine Alps, also known as the Valais Alps, are a mountain range in the western part of the Alps. They are located in Italy (the Aosta Valley and Piedmont) and Switzerland (Valais).

The Pennine Alps are amongst the three highest major subranges of the Alps, together with the Bernese Alps and the Mont Blanc massif.

Geography 
The Italian side is drained by the rivers Dora Baltea, Sesia and Toce, tributaries of the Po. The Swiss side is drained by the Rhône.

The Great St Bernard Tunnel, under the Great St Bernard Pass, leads from Martigny, Switzerland to Aosta.

Morphology
The main chain (watershed between the Mediterranean Sea and the Adriatic Sea) runs from west to east on the border between Italy (south) and Switzerland (north). From Mont Vélan, the first high summit east of St Bernard Pass, the chain rarely goes below 3000 metres and contains many four-thousanders such as Matterhorn or Monte Rosa. The valleys are quite similar on both side of the border, being generally oriented perpendicular to the main chain and descending progressively into the Rhône Valley on the north and the Aosta Valley on the south. Unlike many other mountain ranges, the higher peaks are often located outside the main chain and found themselves between the northern valleys (Grand Combin, Weisshorn, Mischabel, Weissmies).

Peaks

The chief peaks of the Pennine Alps are:

Glaciers

Main glaciers:

Gorner Glacier
Corbassière Glacier
Findel Glacier
Zmutt Glacier
Zinal Glacier
Otemma Glacier
Allalin Glacier
Ferpècle Glacier
Fee Glacier
Mont Miné Glacier
Ried Glacier
Turtmann Glacier
Moiry Glacier
Arolla Glacier
Moming Glacier
Cheilon Glacier
Rossbode Glacier

Passes

The chief passes of the Pennine Alps are:

Nature conservation 
Some regional nature parks, like the Parco Naturale Alta Valsesia  (6,511 ha - Piedmont, IT), the Riserva Naturale Mont Mars (390 ha - Aosta Valley, IT)  and the Regional park of Binn valley (15,891 ha - Valais, CH), have been established on both sides of the main water divide.

See also
 Alpi Cusiane
 Biellese Alps
 Swiss Alps

Maps
 Swiss official cartography (Swiss Federal Office of Topography - Swisstopo); on-line version:  map.geo.admin.ch
 Italian official cartography (Istituto Geografico Militare - IGM); on-line version: www.pcn.minambiente.it

References

 
Mountain ranges of the Alps
Mountain ranges of Piedmont
Mountains of Valais
Mountains of Aosta Valley
Mountains of Switzerland